The 22nd Senate District of Wisconsin is one of 33 districts in the Wisconsin State Senate.  Located in southeast Wisconsin, the district comprises parts of eastern Kenosha and Racine counties, including most of the cities of Racine and Kenosha, and parts of the villages of Mount Pleasant and Somers, east of Wisconsin Highway 31.

Current elected officials
Robert Wirch is the senator representing the 22nd district.  He was first elected to the Senate in the 1996 general election.  Before becoming senator, he was a member of the State Assembly from 1993 to 1997.

Each Wisconsin State Senate district is composed of three Wisconsin State Assembly districts.  The 22nd Senate district comprises the 64th, 65th, and 66th Assembly districts.  The current representatives of those districts are:
 Assembly District 64: Tip McGuire (D–Somers)
 Assembly District 65: Tod Ohnstad (D–Kenosha)
 Assembly District 66: Greta Neubauer (D–Racine)

The district is also located entirely within Wisconsin's 1st congressional district, which is represented by U.S. Representative Bryan Steil.

Past senators
A partial list of all previous senators from this district:

Note: the boundaries of districts have changed repeatedly over history. Previous politicians of a specific numbered district have represented a completely different geographic area, due to redistricting.

References

External links
District Website
Senator Wirch's Website

Wisconsin State Senate districts
Racine County, Wisconsin
Kenosha County, Wisconsin
1852 establishments in Wisconsin